Niña de Antequera (María Barruz Martínez, 1920 - 1972) was a Spanish flamenco singer.

Career

Niña de Antequera began her career in flamenco in Jaén when she was only twelve years.

She became a popular artist beginning in the 1940s in Seville, where she performed with El Niño de la Huerta, Nina de la Puebla, Pepe Pinto, Pepe Marchena, Enrique Montoya, Porrina de Badajoz, Rafael Farina, Antonio Molina and Juanito Valderrama.

She died following a traffic accident in Sevilla in 1972.

Discography
 Doña Omar
 ¡Ay, mi perro!
 Llegó el florero

References

1920 births
1972 deaths
People from Seville
Flamenco singers
20th-century Spanish women singers
20th-century Spanish singers